Los Osos Creek is a stream in coastal San Luis Obispo County that discharges to Morro Bay.  Los Osos Creek rises in the Clark Valley on the slopes of the Irish Hills. After flowing through Clark Valley, Los Osos Creek flows into Los Osos Valley.  In prehistoric times Chumash Native Americans had a significant settlement on a stabilized sand dune near the mouth of Los Osos Creek.

See also
 Morro Rock

References

Rivers of San Luis Obispo County, California
Morro Bay
Rivers of Southern California